"Can't Nobody Hold Me Down" is the debut single by rapper Puff Daddy.  It appears on Puff Daddy's debut studio album No Way Out and it was released as his first single in 1997. The single was released through BMG Music, Arista Records and Puff Daddy's Bad Boy Records.

The song entered the U.S. Billboard Hot 100 at number thirty-two in early 1997 and eventually spent six weeks at number one. It was the beginning of Combs' and Bad Boy Records' chart domination during the year—the Combs-produced "Hypnotize" by The Notorious B.I.G. would follow this song at number one, and the B.I.G. tribute song "I'll Be Missing You" spent eleven weeks at number one during the summer, only to be followed by another B.I.G. song, "Mo Money Mo Problems" and then the Combs-produced "Honey" by Mariah Carey.

Combs was already a successful songwriter, producer and record label owner (Bad Boy Records) before he released his debut album as a performer.  His first U.S. chart single, "No Time", was a top-twenty hit for Lil' Kim on which Puff Daddy was credited as a featured vocalist. "Can't Nobody Hold Me Down" is the debut chart appearance for rapper Mase.

Content
The song combines elements of several previous singles, the most obvious being a slowed-down rhythm track sampling from Grandmaster Flash and the Furious Five's "The Message". The track's chorus is an interpolation of "Break My Stride", a top-five single by Matthew Wilder from 1983. The track also contains a sample of opening drums of Michael Jackson's 1979 single "Rock with You".

Music video
The music video was directed by Paul Hunter and it was released in January 1997. The music video features cameos by The Notorious B.I.G. and Eddie Griffin.

Charts

Weekly charts

Year-end charts

Decade-end charts

All-time charts

Certifications

See also
List of Hot 100 number-one singles of 1997 (U.S.)
R&B number-one hits of 1997 (USA)

References

1997 debut singles
Sean Combs songs
Mase songs
Music videos directed by Paul Hunter (director)
Billboard Hot 100 number-one singles
Bad Boy Records singles
Songs written by Sean Combs
1996 songs
Songs written by Stevie J
Songs written by Mase
Songs written by Sylvia Robinson